Laine is  Finnish and Estonian for "wave", and a surname in various languages. Laine as a surname originates in Finland, where it is the seventh most common surname. In Estonian, it is also a female given name.

Geographical distribution
In Finland, the frequency of the surname Laine was in 2014 higher than national average (1:297) in the following regions:
 1. Southwest Finland (1:117)
 2. Satakunta (1:155)
 4. Tavastia Proper (1:155)
 5. Päijänne Tavastia (1:201)
 6. Pirkanmaa (1:244)
 7. Uusimaa (1:270)

Given name
As of 1 January 2022, in Estonia, 1,709 women have the first name Laine, making it the 98th most popular female name in the country. The first name Laine is most common in Jõgeva County, where 28.31 per 10,000 inhabitants of the county bear the name.

Notable people bearing the give name Laine include:

 Laine Erik (born 1942), Estonian middle-distance runner
 Laine Hardy (born 2000), American singer-songwriter
 Laine Mägi (born 1959), Estonian actress
 Laine Mesikäpp (1917–2012), Estonian actress, singer, folk song collector
 Laine Randjärv (born 1964), Estonian politician
 Laine Tarvis (born 1937), Estonian politician
 Laine Villenthal (1922–2009), Estonian Lutheran cleric

Surname
 Andrew Laine, American engineer
 Célestin Lainé (1908–1983), a Breton nationalist and collaborator during the Second World War 
 Cleo Laine (born 1927), English jazz and pop singer 
 Doris Laine (1931-2018), Finnish ballet dancer
 Denny Laine (born 1944), English musician, singer, songwriter, and guitarist
 Edvin Laine (1905–1989), Finnish film director
 Emma Laine (born 1986), Finnish tennis player
 Erkki Laine (1957–2009), Finnish ice hockey player
 Frankie Laine (1913–2007), American singer, songwriter, and actor 
 Helena Laine (born 1955), Finnish javelin thrower 
 James Laine, American academic, Professor of Religious Studies
 Janet-Laine Green (born 1951), Canadian actress
 Janne-Pekka Laine (born 2001), Finnish football player
 Jarkko Laine (1947–2006), Finnish poet and a writer 
 Jo Jo Laine (1952—2006), American singer, model and actress 
 Joseph Lainé (1768–1835), French lawyer and politician
 Lari Laine (born Corrine Cole, 1937), American model and actress
 Liliana Laine (born 1923), French film actress
 Murray De Laine (born 1936), Australian politician.
 Papa Jack Laine (1873–1966), American musician 
 Patrik Laine (born 1998), Finnish ice hockey player
 Paul Laine, Canadian rock musician
 Sari Laine (born 1962), Finnish karateka
 Skylar Laine (born 1994), American singer
 Teemu Laine (born 1982), Finnish ice hockey player
 Tormis Laine (born 2000), Estonian alpine skier

References

Estonian feminine given names
Finnish-language surnames
Surnames of Finnish origin